The Bahrain Institute of Banking and Finance (abbreviated as BIBF) is a semi-governmental higher education institute situated in the Juffair district of Manama, in the Kingdom of Bahrain. Founded in 1981 as the Bahrain Bankers Training Centre, it is affiliated with the Central Bank of Bahrain and offers more than 400 various training courses in banking, accounting, Islamic finance, insurance, information technology and marketing. BIBF is largely responsible for the Bahrainization of the finance sector in the country. It is affiliated with Bangor University.

History
Since the institute's inception, it has trained over 100,000 students throughout its various courses.

Facilities
The BIBF campus is located in Juffair, an eastern district of the Bahraini capital Manama. The campus consists of a building that itself contains 26 classrooms and 4 computer laboratories. Additionally, the campus hosts a Pearson VUE assessment centre, an 80-seat seminar room, a student lounge and a cafe.

BIBF is currently developing its new campus in Bahrain Bay. Once completed, the building will span an area of 23,000 square metres and consist of 9 separate floors, 50 lecture halls and an auditorium with a capacity of 400 students. The new campus is designed by Gulf House Engineering.

References

1981 establishments in Bahrain
Educational institutions established in 1981
Universities in Bahrain
Buildings and structures in Manama